Shanon Sexton, better known by her stage name Susan Sexton, is a former professional wrestler. Sexton was born in Perth, Western Australia.
She was trained by Ali Musa the Turk.

Wrestling career
Sexton went to the United States in 1975 and began working for Mildred Burke. After briefly working for Burke, she began working independent cards around the world.
In 1989, she worked for the American Wrestling Association.

Ladies Professional Wrestling Association
Sexton joined the Ladies Professional Wrestling Association and was the first woman awarded the LPWA Singles Championship. She defended the title against numerous opponents. In 1990, World Championship Wrestling recognized Sexton (then the LPWA champion) as the World Women's Champion. Sexton defended the title against Bambi at Clash of the Champions XII: Fall Brawl '90.

She lost the title to Lady X on 31 January 1991 in Laughlin, Nevada.

Retirement
Sexton has relocated to Los Angeles, where after a brief time as a "psychic" and a tarot card reader, she now helps train new wrestlers and also has a writing career.

Acting career
Sexton was featured in the 1989 film American Angels- Baptism of Blood in which most of the cast were members of the now defunct Powerful Women of Wrestling.

Championships and accomplishments
Cauliflower Alley Club
Other honoree (1995)
 Ladies Professional Wrestling Association
 LPWA Championship (1 time)

References

External links
 
 Susan Sexton in LPWA
 

Australian female professional wrestlers
Living people
Australian emigrants to the United States
Year of birth missing (living people)
Sportswomen from Western Australia
Professional wrestling trainers
Sportspeople from Perth, Western Australia